Robert Blyth may refer to:

 Robert Blyth (footballer) (1900–1956), Scottish footballer
 Robert Blyth (bishop) (1470–1547), bishop of Down and Connor
 Robert Henderson Blyth (1919–1970), Scottish landscape painter and artist
 Bob Blyth (Robert Fleming Blyth, 1869–1941), Scottish footballer and manager

See also
 Robert Blythe (disambiguation)